Jawless vertebrates, which today consist entirely of lampreys and hagfish, have an adaptive immune system similar to that found in jawed vertebrates. The cells of the agnathan AIS have roles roughly equivalent to those of B-cells and T-cells, with three lymphocyte lineages identified so far:

VLRA (most similar to α/β T cells, in its role and pathway of differentiation)
VLRB (most similar to B cells)
VLRC (most similar to γ/δ T cells)

VLRA and VLRB were identified in 2009, while VLRC was discovered in 2013. Instead of immunoglobulins, they use variable lymphocyte receptors.

Antigen receptors
Jawless vertebrates do not have immunoglobulins (Igs), the key proteins to B-cells and T-cells.  However, they do possess a system of leucine-rich repeat (LRR) proteins that make up variable lymphocyte receptors (VLRs).  This system can produce roughly the same number of potential receptors that the Ig-based system found in jawed vertebrates can. Instead of recombination-activating genes (RAGs), genes coding for VLRs can be altered by a family of cytidine deaminases known as APOBEC, possibly through gene conversion. Cytidine deaminase 1 is associated with the assembly of VLRA and VLRC and cytidine deaminase 2 appears to assemble VLRB.

Evolution 
The gene expression profiles of lymphocyte-like cells (LLCs) in jawless vertebrates indicate that VLRB+ LLCs and B cells share a common ancestor, and VLRA+ and VLRC+ LLCs and T cells share a common ancestor. Like B cells and T cells, the development of VLRB+ LLCs is spatially separated from the development of VLRA+ and VLRC+ LLCs. VLRB+ LLCs and B cells develop in hematopoietic tissues: VLRB+ LLCs develop in the typhlosole and kidneys and B cells develop in bone marrow. VLRA+ and VLRC+ LLCs develop in a thymus-like organ called the thymoid, similar to T cells developing in the thymus. VLRB molecules and B cells can directly bind to antigens and VLRB-transfected cells secrete VLRB protein products, similar to B cells in jawed vertebrates. VLRA+ LLCs were unable to bind Bacillus anthracis, Escherichia coli, Salmonella typhimurium, or Streptococcus pneumoniae before or after immunization, suggesting that VLRAs require antigen processing like TCRs. However, MHCs or MHC-like molecules that could present processed antigens have not been found in lampreys, and some VLRAs expressed in yeast were able to directly bind to antigens. The antigen binding of VLRCs has not been studied. However, the VLRC gene is close in proximity and sequence to the VLRA gene and the two are often co-expressed in LLCs, suggesting that both are TCR-like receptors.

References

Further reading
 

Agnatha
Immune system